Jürgen Mandl (born August 19, 1965 in Graz) is an Austrian footballer (soccer player), decathlete, and bobsledder who competed from the mid-1970s to the early 1990s.

Mandl started out competing for the Sturm Graz club for six years before switching to decathlon in 1980. He earned his best decathlon score of 7646 in 1986 and was national champion the previous year. A back injury prevented him from competing in the World Championships in Athletics though he did compete at the 1986 European Championships in Athletics in Stuttgart, West Germany in the decathlon, but did not finish. but by then Mandl switched to bobsleigh where he found a degree of success.

Mandl won a bronze medal in the four-man event at the 1990 FIBT World Championships in St. Moritz.

Decathlon achievements

References
Bobsleigh four-man world championship medalists since 1930

1965 births
Living people
Sportspeople from Graz
Austrian sportsperson-politicians
Austrian decathletes
Austrian male bobsledders
Austrian footballers
Austrian politicians
Austrian male athletes
Association football defenders